is a trans-Neptunian object, classified as a scattered and detached object, located in the outermost region of the Solar System. It was first observed on 24 March 2014 by astronomers with the Pan-STARRS survey at Haleakala Observatory, Hawaii, United States. With its perihelion distant from Neptune, it belongs to a small and poorly understood group of objects with moderate eccentricities. It is estimated to measure  in diameter, assuming a low albedo.

Orbit and classification 

 orbits the Sun at a distance of 51.7–100.6 AU once every 664 years (242,547 days; semi-major axis of 76.11 AU). Its orbit has a moderate eccentricity of 0.32 and an inclination of 30° with respect to the ecliptic.

Considered a scattered and detached object,  is particularly unusual as it has an unusually circular orbit for a scattered-disc object (SDO). Although it is thought that traditional scattered-disc objects have been ejected into their current orbits by gravitational interactions with Neptune, the low eccentricity of its orbit and the distance of its perihelion (SDOs generally have highly eccentric orbits and perihelia less than 38 AU) seems hard to reconcile with such celestial mechanics. This has led to some uncertainty as to the current theoretical understanding of the outer Solar System. The theories include close stellar passages, unseen planet/rogue planets/planetary embryos in the early Kuiper belt, and resonance interaction with an outward-migrating Neptune. The Kozai mechanism is capable of transferring orbital eccentricity to a higher inclination.

Physical characteristics 

References

External links 
 List Of Centaurs and Scattered-Disk Objects, Minor Planet Center
 List of Known Trans-Neptunian Objects, Johnston's Archive
 
 

Minor planet object articles (unnumbered)

20140324
Trans-Neptunian objects in a 1:4 resonance